Chambly is an off-island suburb of Montreal in southwestern Quebec, Canada. It is located in the Montérégie region, inland from the South Shore of the Saint Lawrence River.

It was formed from the merger in 1965 of Fort-Chambly (formerly Chambly-Canton prior to 1952) and the old city of Chambly (formerly Chambly-Basin prior to 1952, and earlier sometimes called Bassin-de-Chambly).

Geography 

History

Descendants of European immigrants have lived in Chambly since the 17th century, but Chambly was  not incorporated as a city until 1965.

Samuel de Champlain passed through the area that came to be the site of the town of Chambly, QC, in 1609., when he wrote the following in his journal:

Fort Chambly was captured by American forces on October 20, 1775 during the American Invasion of Canada of 1775–76, it was held until the spring of 1776 when it was evacuated and burned, as the Americans retreated southward to Fort Ticonderoga. Subsequently, prisoners-of-war from the Continental Army, including Colonel William Stacy, were held at Fort Chambly until the end of the American Revolutionary War.

During the occupation the 1st Canadian Regiment, an Extra Continental regiment, was raised by James Livingston to support Colonial efforts in the American Revolutionary War during the invasion of Quebec. Livingston recruited men from Chambly, Quebec  as early as September 1775, but a formal regimental designation was made by Richard Montgomery on November 20, 1775, with recognition by the Second Continental Congress following on January 8, 1776. The regiment, which never approached its authorized size of 1,000 men, saw action primarily in the Canadian theater and New York, and was disbanded on January 1, 1781.

The College of Chambly was chartered on March 21, 1835 in Lower Canada.

Fort Chambly
 

Chambly is home to the massive Fort Chambly, built with local stone between 1709 and 1711 in the style of Vauban's classic French fortifications. It was built at the mouth of a large basin, on the site of successive wooden forts dating back to 1665. Fort Chambly was the largest in a series of fortifications on the shores of what was known as the Iroquois River (later known as the Chambly River, finally becoming the Richelieu River in the nineteenth century). Originally called Fort Saint-Louis, it soon came to be known by the name of its first commanding officer, Jacques de Chambly, to whom the surrounding seigniory was granted in 1672. It was intended to protect New France in general (and Montreal in specific) from attack from hostile natives and the English. Today, the fort is run by Parks Canada and is designated a National Historic Site of Canada, and houses a museum and interpretive centre, and hosts historical re-enactments of military drills (as well as a number of contemporary cultural events).

A small local population clustered around the fort, and the entire area eventually became known as Chambly as well. Among the buildings around the Fort was St. Stephen's Anglican Church, which was built to serve the soldiers in garrison as well as the local Loyalist and English settler population.

Chambly Canal 
 

Chambly is also known for the Chambly Canal, a National Historic Site run by Parks Canada. It was built in 1843 to bypass several kilometers of successive Richelieu River rapids between the towns of Chambly, QC, and Saint-Jean-sur-Richelieu. Part of a series of waterways connecting the Saint Lawrence River and New York City, Chambly Canal was built to facilitate commercial traffic between Canada and the United States.

Trade dwindled after World War I, and as of the 1970s, traffic has been replaced by recreational vessels. Today the canal is enjoyed by tourists and more than 7,000 pleasure boats in the summer, and ice skaters in the winter.

St-Joseph of Chambly Church, at 164 rue Martel, was built between 1880 and 1881. The parish was founded in 1665.

Demographics 

Population trend:

Mother tongue language (2021)

Economy

Transportation
The exo Chambly-Richelieu-Carignan region provides commuter and local bus services.

Education
In English, the South Shore Protestant Regional School Board and later the Richelieu Valley School Board previously served the municipality. Currently Chambly is served by the Riverside School Board and specifically by William Latter Elementary School. Anglophone secondary students in Chambly are zoned for Heritage Regional High School in Longueuil's Saint-Hubert borough.

In French, the Commission scolaire des Patriotes serves Chambly, with the following schools located in the municipality:
 École De Bourgogne (Elementary)
 École De Salaberry (Elementary)
 École Jacques-De Chambly (Elementary)
 École Sainte-Marie (Elementary)
 École Madeleine-Brousseau (Elementary)
 École secondaire de Chambly (Secondary 1, 2 and 3)

Media
Chambly is currently served by a local weekly newspaper called the "Journal de Chambly", first published in 1966.

A small daily news sheet called Chambly Matin also maintains a journalistic presence on the internet reporting on local issues.

Notable people 
 Emma Albani – Opera singer
 Mathieu Joseph - ice hockey player
 Georges Larivière, professor, writer, ice hockey coach
 Ricardo Larrivée – Television personality
 Robert Lebel – Former mayor of Chambly, Hockey Hall of Fame inductee
 Étienne Lucier – Fur trader
 Étienne Provost – Fur trader
 Jacqueline Simoneau – Olympian

See also
List of cities in Quebec

References

External links
Town of Chambly website

 
Cities and towns in Quebec
Incorporated places in La Vallée-du-Richelieu Regional County Municipality